John Schultz is an American film director, screenwriter, producer and former musician.

Biography
Schultz started his writing and directing career with the documentary The Making of 'Jurassic Park''' (1995) but has since directed such films as Bandwagon, Drive Me Crazy, Like Mike, When Zachary Beaver Came to Town, The Honeymooners, Aliens in the Attic, Judy Moody and the Not Bummer Summer, A Christmas Prince: The Royal Wedding, and Adventures in Babysitting'', a Disney Channel Original Movie.

Prior to his career in film, Schultz was the original drummer of The Connells, a Raleigh, North Carolina, band.  He left in 1985.

References

External links

John Schultz and Doug MacMillan: The streak lives on

American film producers
American male screenwriters
Living people
Place of birth missing (living people)
Writers from Raleigh, North Carolina
Musicians from Raleigh, North Carolina
1960 births
Businesspeople from Raleigh, North Carolina
20th-century American drummers
American male drummers
Film directors from North Carolina
Screenwriters from North Carolina
20th-century American male musicians